BBC Children in Need (also promoted as  in Wales) is the BBC's UK charity. Since 1980, it has raised over £1.5 billion for disadvantaged children and young people in the UK. When totalising up the money, it totals £1,569,978,236 from 1980 to 2022.

One of the highlights is an annual telethon, held in November and televised on BBC One and BBC Two. Pudsey Bear has been BBC Children in Need's mascot since 1985, whilst Sir Terry Wogan was its long-standing host for 35 years. A prominent annual event in British television, Children in Need is one of two high-profile British telethons. It is the only charity belonging to the BBC, the other telethon being Red Nose Day, supporting Comic Relief.

Following the closure of the BBC Television Centre, the telethon broadcasts took place at the BBC Elstree Centre from 2013 to 2020.

The telethon previously lasted for up to 7 hours, but since 2020 has been reduced to a 3 hour programme from 7pm until 10pm.

In 2020, due to the COVID-19 pandemic, the telethon was reduced to a singular programme with only four presenters: Mel Giedroyc, Alex Scott, Chris Ramsey and Stephen Mangan. The 42nd appeal show, which aired on 19 November 2021, took place at a new location of Dock10, MediaCityUK in Salford.

History

Earlier BBC appeals 
The BBC's first broadcast charity appeal took place in 1927, in the form of a five-minute radio broadcast on Christmas Day. It raised about £1,342, which equates to about £69,950 by today's standards, and was donated to four children's charities.

The first televised appeal took place in 1955 and was called the Children's Hour Christmas Appeal, with the yellow glove puppet Sooty Bear and Harry Corbett fronting it. The Christmas Day Appeals continued on TV and radio until 1979. During that time a total of £625,836 was raised. Terry Wogan first appeared during this five-minute appeal in 1978 and again in 1979. Sometimes cartoon characters such as Peter Pan and Tom and Jerry were used.

BBC Children in Need 

In 1980, the first Children in Need telethon was broadcast. It was a series of short segments linking the evening's programming instead of the usual continuity. It was devoted to raising money exclusively destined for charities working with children in the United Kingdom. The new format, presented by Terry Wogan, Sue Lawley and Esther Rantzen, saw a dramatic increase in public donations: £1 million was raised that year.

The format was developed throughout the 1980s to the point where the telethon segments grew longer and the regular programming diminished, eventually being dropped altogether from 1984 in favour of a single continuous programme. This format has grown in scope to incorporate further events broadcast on radio and online. As a regular presenter, Wogan had become firmly associated with the annual event, continuing to front it until 2014. The following year, he started to endure ill health, from which he died in 2016.

In 1988, BBC Children in Need became a registered charity (number 802052) in England and Wales, followed by registration in Scotland (SC039557) in 2008. 
In 2020, BBC Children in Need attended a Formula one Race with Mclaren F1 Team to help support children in need in Turkey.

The current chief executive since 2016 is Simon Antrobus.

Sponsorships
Asda has been a part of the Children in Need charity. Other sponsorships include Greggs, Boots, Welcome Break (which includes WHSmith, Waitrose, Subway, Burger King, Pret, Starbucks and Harry Ramsden's.), Costco UK and Cineworld additionally joined the Children in Need charity.

Sir Terry Wogan Fundraiser of the Year Award
An award called the Sir Terry Wogan Fundraiser of the Year has been presented since 2016 to someone who has gone above and beyond to help raise money for Children in Need. The award was set up by Terry's family and was presented by Terry's son, Mark, at the 2016 telethon in memory of the late Sir Terry Wogan. Joanna Lumley awarded it to Ellie and Abbie Holloway during the 2017 telethon. In 2021 Michael Ball turned up to present the prestigious award to Amy Wright.

Telethon

Acts 
The telethon features performances from many top singers and groups, with many celebrities also appearing on the -hour-long programme performing various activities such as sketches or musical numbers. Featured celebrities often include those from programmes on rival network ITV, including some appearing in-character, and/or from the sets of their own programmes. A performance by BBC newsreaders became an annual fixture. Stars of newly opened West End musicals regularly perform a number from their show later in the evening after "curtain call" in their respective theatres.

Broadcast 

The BBC devotes the entire night's programming on its flagship channel BBC One to the Children in Need telethon, with the exception of 35 minutes at 10 o'clock while BBC News at Ten, Weather and Regional News airs, and activity continues on BBC Two with special programming, such as Mastermind Children in Need, which is a form of Celebrity Mastermind, with four celebrities answering questions on a chosen subject and on general knowledge.

In recent years, before the telethon itself, the BBC has broadcast Children in Need specials including DIY SOS The Big Build, Bargain Hunt, The One Show, in which hosts Matt Baker and Alex Jones did a rickshaw challenge and a celebrity version of Pointless in which Pudsey assists hosts Alexander Armstrong and Richard Osman.

Unlike the other BBC charity telethon Comic Relief, Children in Need relies substantially on the BBC regions for input into the telethon night. The BBC English regions all have around 5–8-minute round-ups every hour during the telethon. This does not interrupt the schedule of items shown from BBC Television Centre as the presenters usually hand over to the regions, giving those in the main network studio a short break. 

BBC Scotland, BBC Cymru Wales and BBC Northern Ireland, however, opted out of the network schedule with a considerable amount of local fundraising news and activities from their broadcast area. Usually they went over to the network broadcast at various times of the night, and usually they showed some network items later than when the English regions saw them. This was to give the BBC nations of Scotland, Wales and Northern Ireland a much larger slot than the BBC English regions because the "nations" comprise a distinct audience of the BBC. Usually BBC Scotland, Wales and Northern Ireland handed back to network coverage from around 1:00 am on the telethon night. For the 2010 appeal this changed, with Northern Ireland, Scotland and Wales deciding not to have their usual opt-outs and instead following the English regions' pattern of having updates every hour.

Presenters  

Sir Terry Wogan (1980–2014)
Sue Lawley (1980–1982)
Esther Rantzen (1980–1982)
Gloria Hunniford (1983)
Sue Cook (1984–1995)
Joanna Lumley (1984, 1988)
Andi Peters (1992–1994)
Gaby Roslin (1995–2004)
Fearne Cotton (2005–2008, 2010–2015)
Natasha Kaplinsky (2005–2006)
Matt Allwright (2005)
Chris Moyles (2006)
Tess Daly (2008–2019)
Alesha Dixon (2008–2009, 2011)
Peter Andre (2009–2010)
Nick Grimshaw (2012–2015)
Zoe Ball (2013)
Shane Richie (2013–2015)
Rochelle Humes (2014–2019)
Marvin Humes (2016–2019)
Dermot O'Leary (2015)
Ade Adepitan (2016–2019, 2021–present)
Greg James (2016)
Graham Norton (2016–2019, 2021)
Russell Kane (2016)
Mel Giedroyc (2017–present)
Matt Edmondson (2017)
Rob Beckett (2018)
Tom Allen (2019)
Alex Scott (2020–present)
Chris Ramsey (2020–present)
Stephen Mangan (2020)
Jason Manford (2022–present)

Overview

Children in Need Rocks

Pudsey Bear 

The mascot fronting the Children in Need appeal is called Pudsey Bear. He was created and named in 1985 by BBC graphic designer Joanna Lane, who worked in the BBC's design department. Asked to revamp the logo, with a brief to improve the charity's image, Lane said "It was like a lightbulb moment for me. We were bouncing ideas off each other and I latched on to this idea of a teddy bear. I immediately realised there was a huge potential for a mascot beyond the 2D logo". The bear was named after her hometown of Pudsey, West Yorkshire, where her grandfather was mayor.

A reproduction of the bear mascot (made of vegetation) is in Pudsey park, near the town centre. Originally introduced for the 1985 appeal, Pudsey Bear was created as a triangular shaped logo, depicting a yellow-orange teddy bear with a red bandana tied over one eye. The bandana had a pattern of small black triangles. The mouth of the bear depicted a sad expression. The lettering "BBC" appeared as 3 circular black buttons running vertically down the front of the bear, one capital letter on each, in white. Perpendicular to the buttons, the words "children-in-need" appeared in all lower case letters along the base of the triangular outline. Accessibility for young readers, and people with disabilities including speech and reading challenges, were factors weighed by the designer Joanna Ball, specifically the "P" sound in "Pudsey" name, and the choice of all lower case sans serif letters for the logotype.

The original design was adapted for various applications for use in the 1985 appeal, both 2D graphics and three-dimensional objects. Items using the original 1985 design included a filmed opening title sequence, using cartoon cell animation, a postage stamp, and a prototype soft toy, commissioned from a film and TV prop maker (citation). The original prototype soft toy was orange and reflected the design of the logo, which was then adapted for approximately 12 identical bears, one for each regional BBC Television Studio. These bears were numbered and tagged with the official logo and auctioned off as part of the appeal. The number 1 Pudsey Bear was allocated to the Leeds region. Joanna Lumley appeared with one of the soft toys during the opening of Blackpool Illuminations and named Pudsey Bear the official mascot of the BBC Children in Need appeal.

In 1986, the logo was redesigned. Whilst retaining the concept of a teddy bear with a bandana over one eye, all other elements were changed. Specifically, the triangular elements of the underlying design were abandoned, as well as the corporate identity colour scheme was changed. The new bandana design was white with red spots, one of the buttons was removed and the logotype now appeared as building blocks, which spelled out "BBC CHILDREN IN NEED" in capital letters. Pudsey now has a smiling expression on his face rather than a sad one like the previous logo.

In 2007, Pudsey and the logo were redesigned again. This time, Pudsey's bandana had multicoloured spots, and all of the buttons were removed. By 2009, Pudsey had been joined by another bear, a brown female bear named "Blush". She has a spotty bow with the pattern similar to Pudsey's bandana pattern. In 2013, Moshi Monsters introduced Pudsey as an in-game item for 100 Rox.

The Children in Need 2015 campaign on 13 November 2015 marked the thirtieth birthday of Pudsey Bear, who has been the charity's mascot since 1985.

In 2022, as part of the corporate BBC rebrand, the logo was completely redesigned. The word "CHILDREN IN NEED" in capital letters has been written in a modified rounded version of BBC Reith Sans Bold and Pudsey Bear was removed as part of the logo. Despite this, Pudsey Bear remained in use as a mascot and was also given a redesign.

Official singles 

Notes:
 The Collective includes Gary Barlow, Tulisa Contostavlos, Wretch 32, Ed Sheeran, Ms. Dynamite, Chipmunk, Mz Bratt, Dot Rotten, Labrinth, Rizzle Kicks and Tinchy Stryder.
 The All Star Choir includes Linda Robson, Jo Brand, Mel Giedroyc, Larry Lamb, Craig Revel Horwood, Alison Steadman, Alice Levine, John Craven, Fabrice Muamba, Margaret Alphonsi, Radzi Chinyanganya and Nitin Ganatra
 BBC Radio 2's Allstars consists of Bryan Adams, Izzy Bizu, Cher, Clean Bandit, Melanie C, Jamie Cullum, Ella Eyre, Paloma Faith, Rebecca Ferguson, Jess Glynne, Sheku Kanneh-Mason, Lenny Kravitz, KSI, Lauv, Ava Max, Kylie Minogue, James Morrison, Gregory Porter, Nile Rodgers, Jack Savoretti, Jay Sean, Anoushka Shankar, Robbie Williams and Yola

Criticism 

In November 2006, Intelligent Giving published an article about Children in Need, which attracted wide attention across the British media. The article, titled "Four things wrong with Pudsey", described donations to Children in Need as a "lazy and inefficient way of giving" and pointed out that, as a grant-giving charity, Children in Need would use donations to pay two sets of administration costs. It also described the quality of some of its public reporting as "shambolic".

In 2007, it was reported that presenter Terry Wogan had been receiving an annual honorarium since 1980 (amounting to £9,065 in 2005). This made him the only celebrity paid for his participation in Children in Need. According to Wogan's account, he would "quite happily do it for nothing" and had "never asked for a fee". The BBC stated that the amount, which was paid from BBC resources rather than from the Children in Need charity fund, had "never been negotiated", having instead increased in line with inflation. Two days before the 2007 event, Wogan waived his fee.

There has been concern about the type of groups receiving funding from Children in Need. Writing in The Spectator, Ross Clark noted that funding goes towards controversial groups such as Women in Prison, which campaigns against jailing female criminals. Another charity highlighted was the Children's Legal Centre, which provided funding for Shabina Begum to sue her school as she wanted to wear the jilbāb. Clark pondered whether donors seeing cancer victims on screen would appreciate "that a slice of their donation would be going into the pockets of Cherie Blair to help a teenage girl sue her school over her refusal to wear a school uniform".

A former BBC governor said that Jimmy Savile was kept away from Children In Need. Sir Roger Jones who was also chairman of the charity said he had suspicions about Savile a decade before the news of Savile's sexual abuse scandal came to public light in 2012. His comments came on the day an inquiry into whether the BBC's child protection and whistle-blowing policies were acceptable began.

See also 
ITV Telethon
STV Children's Appeal
Text Santa

References

External links 

 
BBC Television shows
1980s British television series
1990s British television series
2000s British television series
2010s British television series
2020s British television series
British telethons
1980 in British television
1980 establishments in the United Kingdom
Annual events in the United Kingdom
English-language television shows
Organisations based in Salford
Television series by BBC Studios
Television shows shot at BBC Elstree Centre